Alexandru Mihai Ilie (born 19 January 2000) is a Romanian professional footballer who plays as a midfielder for FC Voluntari.

References

External links
 
 
 

2000 births
Living people
People from Zărnești
Romanian footballers
Association football midfielders
Liga I players
Liga II players
ASC Daco-Getica București players
FC Voluntari players